CatSper1, is a protein which in humans is encoded by the CATSPER1 gene.  CatSper1 is a member of the cation channels of sperm family of protein. The four proteins in this family together form a Ca2+-permeant ion channel specific essential for the correct function of sperm cells.

Function 

Calcium ions play a primary role in the regulation of sperm motility. This gene belongs to a family of putative cation channels that are specific to spermatozoa and localize to the flagellum. The protein family features a single repeat with six membrane-spanning segments and a predicted calcium-selective pore region.

References

Further reading

Ion channels